Youssef Hesham (born 27 July 1985) is an Egyptian film director.

Biography
Hesham is a graduate of Misr University for Science and Technology, where he studied broadcasting he also studied film directing in cooperation with the American University in Cairo. He began his career as an editor, freelance director and few times as an assistant director in Egyptian and foreign films and some advertisements. He began directing independently in 2003 with short films and documentaries which drew attention to him as a director and also won him some awards and posts at international festivals. He directed his first full-length feature in 2009 at the age of 24 making him the youngest director in Egyptian cinematic history.

Filmography

References

External links
 

Film directors from Cairo
Living people
1985 births